Robert or Rob Harris may refer to:

Entertainment
 Robert Harris (painter) (1848–1919), Canadian painter
 Robert Harris (English actor) (1900–1995), English actor
 Robert H. Harris (1911–1981), American actor
 Robert Harris (poet) (1951–1993), Australian poet
 Robert Harris (novelist) (born 1957), British novelist
 Robert A. Harris (born 1945), American film preservationist
 Robert J. Harris (writer) (born 1955), Scottish academic and author
 Robert S. Harris, video game programmer
 J. Robert Harris (1925–2000), U.S. composer of the 1967 Spider-Man television series theme
 Rob Harris, guitarist with Jamiroquai and Shuffler

Politics and law
 Robert Harris (Pennsylvania politician) (1768–1851), U.S. congressman from Pennsylvania
 Robert O. Harris (1854–1926), U.S. congressman from Massachusetts
 Robert O. Harris (lawyer) (1929–2007), American labor lawyer
 Robert J. Harris (mayor) (1930–2005), lawyer, professor, and mayor of Ann Arbor, Michigan
 Robert Harris (diplomat) (born 1941), governor of Anguilla
 Robert Edward Harris, Canadian judge in Nova Scotia 
 Rob Harris (South Carolina politician), member of the South Carolina House of Representatives

Religion
 Robert Harris (minister) (1581–1658), English Puritan
 Robert Harris (priest) (1764–1862), Anglican priest and educator
 Robert Harris (bishop) (born 1944), bishop of the Roman Catholic Diocese of Saint John, New Brunswick
 Robert L. Harris, American prelate of the Episcopal Church
 R. Laird Harris (1911–2008), American church leader

Sports
 Robert Harris (golfer) (1882–1959), Scottish amateur golfer
 Robert Harris (basketball) (1886–1964), American basketball player and coach
 Robert Harris (American football) (born 1969), former American football player
 Robert Harris (footballer) (born 1987), Scottish football player
 Rob Harris (referee) (born 1957), English football referee
 Rob Harris (curler) (born 1963), Canadian curler
 Rob Harris (skysurfer) (1966–1995), American skysurfer
 Rob Harris (ice hockey) (born 1953), American ice hockey player

Others
 Robert Harris (railroad manager) (1830–1894), American railroad president
 Robert Harris (Royal Navy officer) (1843–1926), British admiral
 Robert B. Harris (1922–2014), American sailboat designer
 Robert Alton Harris (1953–1992), American murderer
 Robert Wayne Harris (1972–2012), American mass murderer

See also
 Bert Harris (disambiguation)
 Bob Harris (disambiguation)
 Robert Kirby-Harris (born 1952), administrator
 George Harris, 4th Baron Harris (1851–1932), George Robert Canning Harris, British politician and cricketer